A vest frottoir or rubboard is a percussion instrument used in zydeco music similar to a washboard. It is usually made from pressed, corrugated stainless steel and is worn over the shoulders.

It is played as a rhythm instrument by stroking either bottle openers or spoons down it. Many of these instruments are home-made, but Don Landry of Louisiana is one professional maker, making them for Clifton Chenier's band and Elvis Fontenot and the Sugar Bees, amongst others.

In The Amazing Race 32, racers played the vest frottoir during the season's final leg in New Orleans.

References

American musical instruments
Cajun musical instruments
Louisiana Creole culture
North American percussion instruments
Scraped idiophones